Sveinn Rúnar Sigurðsson (born 24 December 1976 in Reykjavík) is an Icelandic songwriter, music producer, and medical doctor, best known for having composed two Eurovision Song Contest entries for Iceland, "Heaven" by Jónsi in 2004 and "Valentine Lost" by Eiríkur Hauksson in 2007. He has also composed music for Chinese action film Wings Over Everest.

Personal life 
Sveinn resides in Sweden and Norway, and also works partly in Moscow, Russia. He holds a doctorate in medicine and in stock trading, and is fluent in the Icelandic, English, Russian, and Hungarian languages.

Career 
Sveinn has studied piano under Ferenc Utassy, Jon Sigurdsson, Pavel Manazek and since the age of 16 has composed music in styles ranging from classical music to folk, pop, rock and EDM.

His first involvement with Eurovision came with his first participation in the Icelandic national final, Söngvakeppnin, in 2003. He composed the song "Með þér" by Guðrún Árný Karlsdóttir and Dísella Lárusdóttir, making it to the final, and ever since has been a regular in Söngvakeppnin. He has penned the entries for famous artists such as Birgitta Haukdal, Eiríkur Hauksson, Magni Ásgeirsson, Jógvan Hansen, among others. He is also the holder of the record for most Söngvakeppnin participations.

Since 2017, he uses the pseudonym SiRiS for his pop and EDM works. He continued writing for Aron Hannes, after their successful Söngvakeppnin collaboration, releasing two singles, "Sumarnótt"  and "Morgunkoss" . He also wrote various other tracks using his real name, including Björgvin Halldórsson's "Hjá mér um jólin" . Using the pseudonym SiRiS, he has composed songs for leading artists in Iceland as well as for artists abroad. Among Icelandic artists, he has written for Dísella Lárusdóttir, Steinar, Yohanna, Íris Hólm, Ragnheiður Gröndal, Kalli Bjarni, Aron Hannes, Birgitta Haukdal, Eiríkur Hauksson, Magni Ásgeirsson, and Björgvin Halldórsson. Among foreign artists, he has written for Eivør, Kristel Lisberg, Kristina Skoubo Bærendsen, Jógvan Hansen, and Paula Valentaitė.

His song "Heaven", which represented Iceland at the Eurovision Song Contest 2004, was covered in Afrikaans by Tobi Jooste as "Kaapstad". The song was well received and in 2006 won the South African Music Awards for "Cover of the Year". Sveinn received his award at a press conference in Finland the following year.

He rarely performs in public, but among his performances he has either recorded or played Edvard Grieg's Piano Concerto, Richard Addinsell's Warsaw Concerto, Frédéric Chopin's Etudes Op. 25 and various Rachmaninoff compositions. In an interview in Istanbul, Turkey, he cited Sergei Rachmaninoff as his favorite composer.

Besides his involvement in pop and classical music, he has also composed music featuring Kristina Bærendsen for Chinese action film Wings Over Everest, written and directed by Fay Yu, which will be released on 15 November 2019.

Eurovision Song Contest

Entries in the Eurovision Song Contest

Entries in Eurovision pre-selections

Söngvakeppnin (Iceland) 

2003: "Með þér" by Guðrún Árný Karlsdóttir & Dísella Lárusdóttir, Final
2006: "100% hamingja" by Heiða, Final
2006: "Útópía" by Dísella Lárusdóttir, 5th
2006: "Mynd af þér" by Birgitta Haukdal, 4th
2007: "Draumur" by Hreimur Heimisson, Semifinal
2007: "Ég les í lófa þínum" by Eiríkur Hauksson, 1st
2012: "Hugarró" by Magni Ásgeirsson, 3rd
2012: "Leyndarmál" by Íris Hólm, Semifinal
2012: "Stund með þér" by Rósa Birgitta Ísfeld, Final
2013: "Ekki líta undan" by Magni Ásgeirsson, Final
2013: "Til þín" by Jógvan Hansen & Stefanía Svavarsdóttir, Final
2013: "Augnablik" by Erna Hrönn Ólafsdóttir, Semifinal
2015: "Augnablik" by Stefania Svavarsdóttir, 6th (Semifinal)
2017: "Tonight" by Aron Hannes, 3rd
2018: "Gold Digger" by Aron Hannes, 4th
2019: "Mama Said" by Kristina Skoubo Bærendsen, 5th
2022: "Keep It Cool" by Suncity and Sanna, Semifinal

Eurovizijos (Lithuania) 

 2018: "1 2 3" by Paula, 6th
2018: "Turn It Up" by Germantė Kinderytė, 12th (Quarterfinal)

External links 

 Artist's homepage
 Ríkisútvarpið RUV - The Icelandic National Broadcasting Service
 by ESCKaz, Andy Mikheev
 Ruv ESC 2013
 Oikotimes
 Eurovision.tv Icelandic ESC 2013
 Eurovision.tv Icelandic ESC 2004
 Icelandic ESC 2015, Augnablik
Iceland in the Eurovision Song Contest 2017

References

1976 births
Living people
Icelandic composers
Icelandic male musicians
20th-century composers
21st-century composers
20th-century male musicians
21st-century male musicians